Imara satrapes is a moth in the Castniidae family. It is found in Brazil, Paraguay and Uruguay.

The wingspan is about 75 mm.

Subspecies
Imara satrapes catharina (Preiss, 1899) from Brazil, Paraguay and Uruguay was formerly considered a distinct subspecies, but was placed as a synonym of Imara satrapes in 2011.

References

Castniidae
Castniidae of South America
Moths of South America
Fauna of Paraguay
Insects of Uruguay
Taxa named by Vincenz Kollar
Moths described in 1839